Anastasia Chistyakova (born 11 February 1997) is a Russian ice hockey player for HC St. Petersburg and the Russian national team.

She represented Russia at the 2019 IIHF Women's World Championship.

References

External links

1997 births
Living people
People from Kolpino
Russian expatriate ice hockey people
Russian expatriate sportspeople in the United States
Russian women's ice hockey defencemen
Competitors at the 2019 Winter Universiade
Universiade medalists in ice hockey
Universiade gold medalists for Russia